P Suneel Kumar Reddy is an Indian director, screenwriter, and film producer who works primarily in Telugu cinema. He is well known for directing critically acclaimed films such as Sontha Ooru, Gangaputrulu, Gulf, Oka Romantic Crime Katha and Oka Criminal Prema Katha. Suneel Kumar Reddy is associated with Sravya Films, a film production house in South.
He is also managing director of Screenshot Infotainment Pvt Ltd.
His films won 18 State Awards and participated in several international film festivals. 
He was awarded as best director and best dialogue writer for his film Gangaputrulu.
He directed a film Nenem…Chinna Pillana? for movie mogul D. Rama Naidu under the banner of Suresh Productions.
He served as a jury member for International Children's Film Festival India. 
He rendered his services as a guest faculty for Annapurna Film School and Ramanaidu Film School and conducted several film workshops across India.

Early life
P. Suneel Kumar Reddy is a native of Alaganipadu of Potti Sriramulu Nellore district in Andhra Pradesh.
He studied in Vizag, Sompeta in the northern coastal districts of Andhra Pradesh.
He completed his degree in Mechanical Engineering. As he was interested in journalism, he started a magazine, Kokila, and acted as editor/publisher of it. Later on he launched an evening daily newspaper, City Roundup,  in Visakhapatnam.

Career
Suneel Kumar Reddy started his career with a film called Silence Please, which is a love story between deaf and mute lovers. His second movie was Hero, a children's film where he shows that both education and indulging in physical activities are important to children; this movie won three Nandi Awards. Reddy also directed a documentary called Chance, which won two Nandi Awards and was screened at the Cairo Film Festival.
In 2009, Reddy released Sontha Ooru, and it was received very well by the audience and also received critical acclaim. It won Best Film of the Year, and debutant actress Tirrtha received the award for Best Actress.
Gangaputrulu, a film about the fisherman community, won Reddy awards for Best Director and Best Dialogue Writer.
His latest Malayalam film, Marubhoomigal, won three prestigious Kerala Critics Awards for Cinematography, Lyrics and Makeup.

Filmography

References

External links 
 

Living people
21st-century Indian film directors
Telugu film directors
1975 births
Film directors from Hyderabad, India